The Ministry of Defence of Tajikistan is the defence ministry of Tajikistan, overseeing the Tajik Ground Forces, Air Force, Mobile Forces. It also oversees purchases of equipment for the Tajik military. The other branches of the military, such as the Border and Internal Troops, are overseen by the Interior Ministry of Tajikistan. The Defence Ministry was founded in 1993 with Russian assistance.

History

Origins 

The ministry succeeded the Defense Committee of the Republic of Tajikistan, led by former military commissar of the Tajik SSR General Muminzhan Mamadjanov. It was founded just weeks after the Soviet Union was officially dissolved and months after Tajikistan declared its independence. The committee went through multiple phases, with one of its chairmen, Farukh Niyazov, being dismissed on 7 May 1992 at the request of the opposition.

Establishment and aftermath 
The Ministry of Defense of the Republic of Tajikistan was established by a presidential decree on January 4, 1993. The ministry was under joint Tajik and Russian control until February 1993, when the armed forces were founded. At the time, 200 officers were sent from Uzbekistan to serve in the new Tajik agency on the orders of future President Emomali Rahmon. In 1994, with assistance from the Russian 201st Military Base and Russian authorities in Moscow, the Tajik ministry became fully functional in leading the armed forces under the directive of the President of Tajikistan. On 18 July 1996, a terrorist attack took place at the grounds of the defense ministry, which resulted in the death of one person and the injury of nine people. In September 2015, a group of armed military personnel led by Abduhalim Nazarzoda attacked the defense ministry in an attempt to overthrow the Rahmon government.

Leadership
 Minister of Defense — Colonel General Sherali Mirzo
 Chief of Staff and First Deputy Minister of Defense — Lieutenant General Emomali Sobirzoda
 Deputy Defense Minister — Saidamir Roziqov
 Deputy Defense Minister — Abduhalim Nazarov

MoD departments and entities 
 Central Office
 Press Center
 Department of Educational Affairs
 Department of Engineers
 Department of Military Equipment
 Department of Homeland Security (founded in 1997)
 Department of International Cooperation
 Department of the Air Force
 Operational Department
 Financial and Budget Department
 Medical Department

Central Office

Press Center
The Press Center of the Ministry of Defense has been operating as an part of the Central Office since 1993 and is subordinated to the Minister of Defense. The head of the press center is appointed and dismissed directly by the Minister of Defense. The staff of the Press Center consists of a mix of military and civilian personnel. The center is headed by the following press secretaries: Colonel Faridun Mahmadalizoda (2007—present). In 2015, as a result of military reforms in the ministry, the Information and Recreation Center was established subordinated to the Press Center. It includes the following:

Ministerial TV Group
Newspaper "Defender of the Homeland"
Official Website of the Ministry
Ensemble "Sharaf" of the Ministry of Defense
The Newspaper "Defender of the Homeland" was founded on 10 December 1993, a day when the first issue of which was published in two languages, Tajik and Russian.  In its first days of its existence, when it was limited to 11 soldiers. The following have been the newspaper's editor-in-chief:

 Hidoyatillo Tilloyev (1993-2002)
Colonel Hilol Muzayanov (2002-2015)
 Lieutenant Colonel Farhod Ibodulloev (since 2015)

The motto of the publication is "Bravery, honor and loyalty".

Medical Department 
The Military Medical Department was established in 1999 on the of the Central Office of the Ministry of Emergency Situations and Civil Defense. The military medical department and the military hospital operated in the building of the Central Office until 2004. In 2009, the Medical Department, the Military Medical Commission and the Military Hospital received a new building in Shohmansur.

Military Hospital 
The Central Military Hospital of the Ministry of Defense is a military hospital for the Tajik Armed Forces. It is located at 40th years of Victory Road in Dushanbe. It cooperates with the Medical Faculty of the Tajik National University.

Institutions

House of Officers
The House of Officers is a cultural center and gentlemen's club of the national army. Construction on the building took place between 2012 and 2016 and was built within the framework of a military agreement between the armed forces and the People's Liberation Army of China. It was commissioned by President Rahmon on 5 May 2016. The building consists of five floors and basement area. Rooms in the building include a swimming pool, a large dining room, working rooms and service centers, assembly halls, recreation and entertainment areas and living compartments. There are approximately 20 bedrooms available in the building. The six-storey building is located on Foteh Niazi Avenue in central squares in Dushanbe.

Previously, a House of Officers carrying the name of Marshal Klement Voroshilov was located in Dushanbe from 1930 to 2003, being controlled by the Russian 201st Military Base.

Central Sports Club of the Army 
The Central Army Sports Club has been operating under the auspices of the Ministry of Defense since 2003. Athletes of this club, contribute to the development of sports in the Armed Forces as well as the promotion of a healthy lifestyle. Since its inception, it has won 570 gold, 371 silver, 407 bronze medals and a total of 1348 honorary awards.

CSKA Pamir Dushanbe is also affiliated with the defence ministry.

Women's Council
Since 1996, the Women's Council has been working under the Ministry of Defense of the Republic of Tajikistan.

Educational entities
 Military Institute of the Ministry of Defense of Tajikistan
 Mastibek Tashmukhamedov Military Lyceum of the Ministry of Defense of Tajikistan

These institutions are the seniormost of their kind in the Tajik Armed Forces.

Subordinate units

Tajik Mobile Forces
The Tajik Mobile Forces, also known as the Mobile Forces of the Ministry of Defense of Tajikistan is made up of 20,000 paratroopers of the armed forces of Tajikistan. The mobile forces is a direct unit of the ministry of defense and is also a service branch of the Tajik Armed Forces, similar to the Russian Airborne Troops. It is currently based at the Dushanbe International Airport in the capital.

Commandant Regiment 
The Commandant Regiment of the Ministry of Defense is the official security unit the ministry responsible for the protection of government officials. It is based in Dushanbe, and provides security for the building of the ministry, the parliament building, and the Kohi Millat. It is the Tajik equivalent to the Commandant's Office of the Moscow Kremlin. The Honour Guard Company of the Ministry of Defense is one of two ceremonial units of the Armed Forces of the Republic of Tajikistan with the other being the special unit of the Presidential National Guard. The company is a purely representative unit made up of members of branches of the armed forces (specifically the Tajik National Army, Tajik Mobile Forces, Tajik Air Force, Presidential National Guard) and serves under the command of the Commandant Regiment. The time frame for drafting into the unit is 3 to 6 months. Its missions include guarding important public buildings in Dushanbe and providing honours for foreign dignitaries and government officials at the Kohi Millat. The company has taken part in many international ceremonies and parades including in a parade on Tiananmen Square in honour of V-J Day in 2015 and a military parade on Red Square in 2020.

Bands

The Military Brass Band of the Ministry of Defense is the main and senior most military band in the armed forces. Although it is officially part of the Tajik National Army, the brass band is a directly reporting unit of the Defence Ministry. The band provides musical support in the annual Victory Day, Independence Day and Armed Forces Day parades, held in May, September and February respectively.

The following military bands also operate under the command of the commandant's of the Ministry of Defense:

Sughd Garrison Band
Khatlon Garrison Band
Badakhshan Garrison Band

The 56-member Tajik Air Force Band (оркестри ҳарбӣ-нафасии) is also maintained.

Other units
 Basic Construction Division
 Guard Battalion (Military Unit 17651)
 Chemical Defense Battalion (Military Unit 15018)
Ski Platoon - It was established in February 2015 and employs 30 servicemen. It operates out of the Gorno-Badakhshan Autonomous Region.
Agrarian Battalion - Established in 2016, soldiers called to this unit must have skills in working with agricultural machinery, tillage and animal husbandry. On the territory of this military unit the activity of enterprises for processing of agricultural products, including meat products is organized.
National Humanitarian De-mining Unit (HDU)

List of Ministers of Defense

See also 

 Presidential National Guard

Links
 Official Website
Official Newspaper of the ministry

References

 
Government of Tajikistan
Government ministries of Tajikistan
1993 establishments in Tajikistan